Clathrodrillia orellana is a species of sea snail, a marine gastropod mollusk in the family Drilliidae.

Description
The shell grows to a length of 7.5 mm, its diameter 3.5 mm.

(Original description) The small, slender shell is whitish. The smooth protoconch contains 1½ whorls followed by 4½ subsequent whorls. The suture is distinct, not constricted or appressed. The anal sulcus is wide and shallow, the fasciole not excavated, inconspicuous. The axial sculpture consists of protractively flexuous incremental lines, stronger near the apex, and in some cases feeble narrow ribs are developed on the earlier whorls, with wider interspaces. The spiral sculpture consists of very fine threads, equal and with subequal interspaces, though a little coarser on the well-rounded base. The aperture is slightly wider than the siphonal canal. The outer lip is thin, flexuous, sometimes a feeble thickening behind it. The whorls are usually rounded but sometimes there is a slight shoulder in front of the fasciole. The columella is short and attenuated in front. The siphonal canal is short and wide.

Distribution
This species occurs in the Atlantic Ocean off Georgia at a depth of 800 m.

References

 Tucker, J.K. 2004 Catalog of recent and fossil turrids (Mollusca: Gastropoda). Zootaxa 682:1–1295.

orellana
Gastropods described in 1927